The 1978 Sam Houston State Bearkats football team represented Sam Houston State University as a member of the Lone Star Conference (LSC) during the 1978 NAIA Division I football season. Led by first-year head coach Melvin Brown, the Bearkats compiled an overall record of 6–5 with a mark of 4–3 in conference play, and finished tied for third in the LSC.

Schedule

References

Sam Houston State
Sam Houston Bearkats football seasons
Sam Houston State Bearkats football